The men's 73 kilograms (Lightweight) competition at the 2014 Asian Games in Incheon was held on 21 September at the Dowon Gymnasium.

Schedule
All times are Korea Standard Time (UTC+09:00)

Results

Main bracket

Final

Top half

Bottom half

Repechage

References

External links
Official website

M73
Judo at the Asian Games Men's Lightweight